Ljubiša Rajković (born 3 October 1950) is a Yugoslav and Serbian former professional footballer who played as a defender.

Club career
Born in Donja Trnava, a village near Niš, Rajković made his senior debut with Radnički Niš in the 1967–68 season. He was a regular member of the team for 12 seasons, helping the club win the Balkans Cup in 1975. In the summer of 1979, Rajković moved abroad to France and signed with Bastia, spending there the final two years of his career.

International career
Between 1970 and 1977, Rajković was capped 14 times for Yugoslavia. He also represented the country at all youth levels.

Honours
Radnički Niš
 Balkans Cup: 1975

References

External links
 
 
 

Living people
1950 births
Sportspeople from Niš
Association football defenders
Yugoslav footballers
Serbian footballers
Ligue 1 players
Yugoslav First League players
FK Radnički Niš players
SC Bastia players
Yugoslav expatriate footballers
Yugoslav expatriates in France
Expatriate footballers in France
Yugoslavia international footballers
Yugoslavia under-21 international footballers